Kratié Airport , is an airport in the capital town of Kratié in Kratié Province, Cambodia. Its distance is about 3.5 kilometers from the town's center. The airport's land area is around 12.5 hectares. Its runway length is 1,180 meters at 30 meters wide on laterite surface.

History
First opened as a military airfield in 1977, it was converted into civilian use in 2006.

Airports in Cambodia
Buildings and structures in Kratié province